One Citizens Plaza is a 13-story office building in Providence, Rhode Island situated at the confluence of the Moshassuck and Woonasquatucket Rivers. It is the headquarters of Citizens Bank.

Finished in 1991, the building had been the first new high-rise in the city in over a decade. It was designed by Jung Brannen Associates of Boston and Robinson Green Beretta of Providence. Local architectural historian McKenzie Woodward does not agree aesthetically with the building, calling it "squat" and "graceless" due to its "dumpy massing and heavy detailing" in his book Guide to Providence Architecture, though he concedes that the floorplan is effective and that its location makes it very desirable commercial space.

References

External links 

Skyscraper office buildings in Providence, Rhode Island
1991 establishments in Rhode Island
Office buildings completed in 1991